A list of films produced by the Bollywood film industry based in Mumbai in 1945:

Highest-grossing films
The seven highest-grossing films at the Indian Box Office in 1945:

A-C

D-J

K-N

O-R

S-Z

References

External links
 Bollywood films of 1945 at the Internet Movie Database

1945
Bollywood
Films, Bollywood